The 1908 New Hampshire gubernatorial election was held on November 3, 1908. Republican nominee Henry B. Quinby defeated Democratic nominee Clarence E. Carr with 50.40% of the vote.

General election

Candidates
Major party candidates
Henry B. Quinby, Republican
Clarence E. Carr, Democratic

Other candidates
Sumner F. Claflin, Socialist
Edmund B. Tetley, Prohibition
Walter H. Lewis, Independent

Results

References

1908
New Hampshire
Gubernatorial